Skein relations are a mathematical tool used to study knots. A central question in the mathematical theory of knots is whether two knot diagrams represent the same knot. One way to answer the question is using knot polynomials, which are invariants of the knot. If two diagrams have different polynomials, they represent different knots. In general, the converse does not hold.

Skein relations are often used to give a simple definition of knot polynomials. A skein relation gives a linear relation between the values of a knot polynomial on a collection of three links which differ from each other only in a small region. For some knot polynomials, such as the Conway, Alexander, and Jones polynomials, the relevant skein relations are sufficient to calculate the polynomial recursively.

Definition
A skein relationship requires three link diagrams that are identical except at one crossing. The three diagrams must exhibit the three possibilities that could occur for the two line segments at that crossing, one of the lines could pass  under, the same line could be over or the two lines might not cross at all. Link diagrams must be considered because a single skein change can alter a diagram from representing a knot to one representing a link and vice versa. Depending on the knot polynomial in question, the links (or tangles) appearing in a skein relation may be oriented or unoriented.

The three diagrams are labelled as follows. Turn the three link diagram so the directions at the crossing in question are both roughly northward. One diagram will have northwest over northeast, it is labelled L−. Another will have northeast over northwest, it's L+. The remaining diagram is lacking that crossing and is labelled L0.

(The labelling is  independent of direction insofar as it remains the same if all directions are reversed. Thus polynomials on undirected knots are unambiguously defined by this method. However, the directions on links are a vital detail to retain as one recurses through a polynomial calculation.)

It is also sensible to think in a generative sense, by taking an existing link diagram and "patching" it to make the other two—just so long as the patches are applied with compatible directions.

To recursively define a knot (link) polynomial, a function F is fixed and for any triple of diagrams and their polynomials labelled as above,

or more pedantically
 for all 
(Finding an F which produces polynomials independent of the sequences of crossings used in a recursion is no trivial exercise.)

More formally, a skein relation can be thought of as defining the kernel of a quotient map from the planar algebra of tangles. Such a map corresponds to a knot polynomial if all closed diagrams are taken to some (polynomial) multiple of the image of the empty diagram.

Example
Sometime in the early 1960s, Conway showed how to compute the Alexander polynomial using skein relations.  As it is recursive, it is not quite so direct as Alexander's original matrix method; on the other hand, parts of the work done for one knot will apply to others. In particular, the network of diagrams is the same for all skein-related polynomials.

Let function P from link diagrams to Laurent series in  be
such that  and a triple of skein-relation diagrams  satisfies the equation

Then P maps a knot to one of its Alexander polynomials.

In this example, we calculate the Alexander polynomial of the cinquefoil knot, the alternating knot with five crossings in its minimal diagram. At each stage we exhibit a relationship involving a more complex link and two simpler diagrams.  Note that the more complex link is on the right in each step below except the last. For convenience, let A = x−1/2−x1/2.

To begin, we create two new diagrams by patching one of the cinquefoil's crossings (highlighted in yellow) so

P() = A × P() + P()

The first diagram is actually a trefoil; the second diagram is two unknots with four crossings. Patching the latter

P() = A × P() + P()

gives, again, a trefoil, and two unknots with two crossings (the Hopf link ). Patching the trefoil

P() = A × P() + P()

gives the unknot and, again, the Hopf link. Patching the Hopf link

P() = A × P() + P()

gives a link with 0 crossings (unlink) and an unknot. The unlink takes a bit of sneakiness:

P() = A × P() + P()

Computations
We now have enough relations to compute the polynomials of all the links we've encountered, and can use the above equations in reverse order to work up to the cinquefoil knot itself. The calculation is described in the table below, where ? denotes the unknown quantity we are solving for in each relation:

Thus the Alexander polynomial for a cinquefoil is P(x) = x−2 -x−1 +1 -x +x2.

Sources
American Mathematical Society, Knots and Their Polynomials, Feature Column.

.

Knot theory
Diagram algebras